Andrew Robert "Bob" Turner (born June 23, 1948) is a Canadian politician who was elected in the 2015 Alberta general election to the Legislative Assembly of Alberta representing the electoral district of Edmonton-Whitemud as a member of the Alberta New Democratic Party. He won his seat with 12,803 votes, defeating incumbent health minister and former mayor of Edmonton, Stephen Mandel by 5,622 votes, or around 57% of the vote to Mandel's 32%. Mandel had previously beaten Turner in an October, 2014 by-election after Mandel was appointed as an unelected minister by then-Premier Jim Prentice.

Turner chose not to run for re-election in the 2019 election, stating "From the beginning, I spoke about the need to move forward in building Nellie Carlson School, with upgrading the Misericordia Hospital and eliminating flavoured tobacco...I've been proud to see all of these goals accomplished".

In his place, the NDP ran Rakhi Pancholi as its candidate. She won the seat, defeating Elisabeth Hughes of the United Conservative Party.

Political career 
Turner served as a member of the Standing Committee on Public Accounts and as a member on the Standing Committee on the Alberta Heritage Savings Trust Fund. Previously he served as chair of the Standing Committee on Privileges and Elections, Standing Orders and Printing.

Turner has been a supporter of issues such as LGBTQ2S+ rights, he replaced a rainbow flag that was cut down from Lillian Osborne High School in June 2017.

Medical career
Turner is a hematologist/oncologist at the University of Alberta Hospital and Cross Cancer Institute and is Professor of Medicine and Oncology at the University of Alberta in Edmonton, Alberta, Canada. He also serves Stanton Medical Clinic in Yellowknife, Northwest Territories. He is a graduate of McGill University medical school and has training in Internal Medicine from Royal Victoria Hospital in Montreal, Quebec and Hematology and Medical Oncology from the University of Pittsburgh. He continues to practice medicine, with a special interest in blood disorders such as acute and chronic leukemias, lymphomas, myelodysplastic syndromes, myeloproliferative neoplasms, mast cell diseases and stem cell transplantation. In the past, Turner was the medical director of the Canadian Red Cross Blood Transfusion Service Center in Edmonton and director of the Division of Clinical Hematology of the University of Alberta. In 2007 he was selected as the Physician of the Year by the Edmonton Zone Medical Staff Association.

Electoral history

2014 by-election

2015 general election

References

1948 births
21st-century Canadian politicians
Alberta New Democratic Party MLAs
Canadian hematologists
Physicians from Alberta
Living people
McGill University Faculty of Medicine alumni
Politicians from Brandon, Manitoba
Politicians from Edmonton
Academic staff of the University of Alberta